2011–12 Serie A1 is the 67th season of Italian Championship (Italian Volleyball League) organized under the supervision of Federazione Italiana Pallavolo.

Teams

Champions
Italian Championship A1: Lube Banca Marche Macerata
Italian Cup A1: Itas Diatec Trentino
Italian Supercup A1: Itas Diatec Trentino

European cups qualification
2012–13 CEV Champions League (3): Lube Banca Marche Macerata, Itas Diatec Trentino, Bre Banca Lannutti Cuneo
2012–13 CEV Cup (1): Andreoli Latina
2012–13 CEV Challenge Cup (1): Copra Elior Piacenza

Italian supercup A1
Venue: PalaRockefeller, Cagliari, Sardinia

|}

Italian cup A1

Regular season 1st half

|}

Final round

Quarterfinals

|}

Semifinals
Venue: PalaLottomatica, Rome, Lazio

|}

Final
Venue: PalaLottomatica, Rome, Lazio

|}

Italian championship A1

Regular season

|}

Playoffs

Quarterfinals

Group A
Venue: PalaTrento, Trento, Trentino-Alto Adige/Südtirol

|}

|}

Group B
Venue: PalaFontescodella, Macerata, Marche

|}

|}

Group C
Venue: PalaBreBanca, Cuneo, Piedmont

|}

|}

Group D
Venue: Spes Arena, Belluno, Veneto

|}

|}

Challenge cup playoff

Semifinals

Sisley Belluno (4) 2:0 M. Roma Volley (8)

|}

Copra Elior Piacenza (6) 2:0 Acqua Paradiso Monza Brianza (7)

|}

Final

Copra Elior Piacenza (6) 1:0 Sisley Belluno (4)

|}

Championship

Semifinals

Itas Diatec Trentino (1) 2:0 Andreoli Latina (9)

|}

Lube Banca Marche Macerata (2) 2:1 Bre Banca Lannutti Cuneo (3)

|}

Final

Lube Banca Marche Macerata (2) 1:0 Itas Diatec Trentino (1)
Venue: Mediolanum Forum, Assago, Lombardy

|}

External links
Official website

Men's volleyball competitions in Italy
2011 in Italian sport
2012 in Italian sport